One Judiciary Square is a highrise office building at 441 Fourth Street NW in the Judiciary Square neighborhood of Washington, D.C. Designed by architect Vlastimil Koubek, the building is  tall and has approximately 10 floors. Its construction ended in 1990.

Background
Between 1992 and 1999, One Judiciary Square housed the offices of the mayor and Council of the District of Columbia while repairs were made to the historic John A. Wilson Building. One Judiciary Square now houses the offices of prominent municipal government agencies such as the District of Columbia State Board of Education, the Office of the D.C. Attorney General, and the D.C. Office of Zoning. In August 2009, it was one of the first government buildings in Washington to be fitted with a green roof. In addition, the city completed a $7.5 million renovation in September 2011 to improve the building's energy efficiency.

The lobby of One Judiciary Square features a statue of Pierre L'Enfant that was commissioned for inclusion in the National Statuary Hall Collection in the United States Capitol. The statue has not been admitted to the collection, however, because the District of Columbia is not a state. A statue of Frederick Douglass was also commissioned; it was accepted by Congress in June 2013 and placed in the United States Capitol Visitors Center, though as part of its joint art collection and not the National Statuary Hall Collection.

References 

Judiciary Square
Office buildings completed in 1990
Skyscraper office buildings in Washington, D.C.
1990 establishments in Washington, D.C.